Sagadat Kozhakhmetovich Nurmagambetov (Sağadat Qojahmetūly Nūrmağambetov, ساعادات قوجاحمەتۇلى نۇرماعامبەتوۆ; , Sagadat Kozhakhmetovich Nurmagambetov; 25 May 1924 – 24 September 2013) was a Soviet and Kazakh general who served as Chairman of Kazakhstan's State Defense Committee in 1991-1992 and Kazakhstan's first Minister of Defense following the dissolution of the Soviet Union in 1991, holding the office of Defense Minister from May 1992 to November 1995. He was an adviser to Nursultan Nazarbayev in 1995-1996. 
 
Nurmagambetov began his military career as a machine gun platoon commander in the Red Army in World War II. He was promoted to machine gun company and infantry battalion commander, earning the honorary title of Hero of the Soviet Union in February 1945. His battalion went on to storm the Reich Chancellory at the Battle of Berlin in April 1945. Nurmagambetov graduated from the Frunze Military Academy after World War II and rose to become one of the highest-ranked Kazakh officers in the peacetime Soviet Army, attaining the rank of colonel-general. He retired from the military of Kazakhstan as an army general in 1995. Nurmagambetov was named a Hero of Kazakhstan in 1994, becoming the first Kazakh to receive this honour.

Biography

Early life and war service 
Nurmagambetov was born on 25 May 1924 in the settlement of Kosym in the Kazak Autonomous Soviet Socialist Republic of the Russian SFSR (later Kazakh Soviet Socialist Republic), now in Aqmola Region in Kazakhstan. He joined the Red Army in 1942. He received accelerated machine gun officer's training at the 1st Turkestan Machine Gun School in Kushka, Turkmen SSR (now Serhetabat in Turkmenistan) and was sent to the front lines of the Eastern Front of World War II in April 1943. He led a machine gun platoon, a machine gun company, and infantry battalion and was awarded the honorary title of Hero of the Soviet Union with the Gold Star of the Hero of the Soviet Union (medal no. 5214) and the Order of Lenin by the Presidium of the Supreme Soviet of the USSR on 27 February 1945. He fought in the Battle of Berlin and led his battalion's troops in the storming of Berlin's Reich Chancellery in April 1945.

Post-war 
Nurmagambetov attended the Frunze Military Academy from June 1946 until his graduation from the Academy in November 1949, continuing his military career as a senior operations section officer for the Turkestan Military District staff, a motorized rifle division's commanding officer and chief of staff, Civil Defense Forces of the Kazakh SSR chief of staff, a deputy commanding officer of the Central Asian Military District, and first deputy commander of the Soviet Union's Southern Group of Forces in Hungary. He was elected to serve as a deputy of Kazakhstan's Supreme Soviet from 1971 until 1994, and chosen to lead its committee on the disabled and military veterans' affairs in 1989.

Post-independence career 
He was appointed to head Kazakhstan's State Defense Committee by Nursultan Nazarbayev in October 1991. He was named Kazakhstan's first Defence Minister following the State Defense Committee's reorganization as the Ministry of Defense of the Republic of Kazakhstan in May 1992 and remained as Defense Minister in Nazarbayev's cabinet until retiring from the armed forces as an army general in November 1995. Nazarbayev later recalled that "After gaining independence, I was looking for a general to lead the troops, and I found one - Nurmagambetov".

He was awarded Kazakhstan's highest official award, the newly established honorary title of Hero of Kazakhstan, in 1994the first Kazakh to attain the honor. He was an adviser to Nazarbayev from 1995 to 1996. He died on 24 September 2013.

Family 
He had two children. His son Talgat (1952-2020) was a major-general in the reserve. He was born in Tashkent while his father served as an officer for the Turkestan Military District. His military career saw him take part in the recovery efforts after the Chernobyl disaster and the Spitak Earthquake, and from 2000-2001, serve as Inspector General of the Ministry of Defense.

Legacy 
 The Astana Zhas Ulan Republican School is named after Nurmagambetov.
 Every year on 25 May (his birthday), flowers are laid at the plaque at his house on Tulebaev-Dzhambul.
 A museum in his honor was opened in the city of Akkol on 19 July 2007.
 On May 25, 2019, a monument to the first Minister of Defense of independent Kazakhstan, Army General Sagadat Nurmagambetov, was unveiled in Almaty.
 In September 2022, a monument to Sagadat Nurmagambetov was opened in Ust-Kamenogorsk.

Honours and awards

Union of Soviet Socialist Republics

 Gold Star of the Hero of the Soviet Union
 Order of Lenin
 Order of the October Revolution
 Order of the Red Banner
 Order of the Patriotic War, 1st class and 2nd class
 Order of the Red Star, twice
 Order for Service to the Homeland in the Armed Forces of the USSR, 3rd class
 Order of the Red Banner of Labour, twice
 Order of the Badge of Honour
 Medal for Combat Service
 Medal "For Military Valour. To commemorate the 100th anniversary of VI Lenin"
 Medal "For Distinction in Guarding the State Border of the USSR"
 Medal "For the Victory over Germany in the Great Patriotic War 1941–1945"
 Jubilee Medal "Twenty Years of Victory in the Great Patriotic War 1941–1945"
 Jubilee Medal "Thirty Years of Victory in the Great Patriotic War 1941–1945"
 Jubilee Medal "Forty Years of Victory in the Great Patriotic War 1941–1945"
 Medal "For the Capture of Berlin"
 Medal "For the Liberation of Warsaw"
 Medal "Veteran of the Armed Forces of the USSR"
 Medal "For Strengthening Military Cooperation" 
 Jubilee Medal "40 Years of the Armed Forces of the USSR"
 Jubilee Medal "50 Years of the Armed Forces of the USSR"
 Jubilee Medal "60 Years of the Armed Forces of the USSR"
 Medal "For Impeccable Service" 1st, 2nd and 3rd classes
 
Republic of Kazakhstan

 Hero of Kazakhstan
 Order of Otan
 Medal "Astana"
 Medal "10 Years of the Armed Forces of the Republic of Kazakhstan"
 Medal "10 years of independence of the Republic of Kazakhstan"
 Jubilee Medal "50 Years of Victory in the Great Patriotic War 1941–1945"
 Jubilee Medal "60 Years of Victory in the Great Patriotic War 1941–1945"

Russian Federation

 Order of Friendship, twice
 Zhukov Medal

Ukraine

 Order of Bohdan Khmelnytsky, 3rd class (2004)
 Honour of the President of Ukraine
 Medal "Defender of the Motherland"
 Jubilee medal "60 years of Ukraine's liberation from Nazi invaders"

Bulgaria

 Order "September 9, 1944", 1st class with swords.

Poland

 Golden Cross of Merit
 Medal Pro Memoria

Mongolia

 Medal "30 Years of Victory over Japan's militarists"

Honorary Citizen of Astana, Almaty and Donetsk.

References

1924 births
2013 deaths
Government ministers of Kazakhstan
Kazakhstani generals
People from Akmola Region
Heroes of the Soviet Union
Recipients of the Order of Lenin
Recipients of the Order of the Red Banner
Heroes of Kazakhstan
Recipients of the Order of Bohdan Khmelnytsky, 3rd class
Recipients of the Medal "For Distinction in Guarding the State Border of the USSR"
Recipients of the Medal of Zhukov
Recipients of the Gold Cross of Merit (Poland)
Soviet colonel generals
Soviet military personnel of World War II
Soviet politicians
Frunze Military Academy alumni
Ministers of Defence of Kazakhstan
Military Academy of the General Staff of the Armed Forces of the Soviet Union alumni